Arto Ensio Tanner (January 9, 1935, Helsinki - October 18, 2002, Helsinki) was a Finnish diplomat and Bachelor of Law. He was Deputy charge d'affaires at Baghdad 1967–1969, Ambassador in Beirut 1977–1981, Damascus 1979-1981 and Kuwait City 1977–1980, Deputy Director General in the Ministry of Foreign Affairs 1981–1982, Diplomatic Inspector  since 1983, Ambassador to  East Berlin 1986–1990, Tel Aviv 1993-1997 and Athens, 1998–2000.

Tanner's son Teemu Tanner is a diplomat and President's Permanent Chief of Staff.

Ambassadors of Finland to Lebanon
Ambassadors of Finland to Syria
Ambassadors of Finland to Kuwait
Ambassadors of Finland to East Germany
Ambassadors of Finland to Israel
Ambassadors of Finland to Greece
Ambassadors of Finland to Iraq
1935 births
2002 deaths